is a role-playing video game developed by Gust Co. Ltd., and the first title within the Atelier game series. It was first released on the PlayStation and, soon after, ported to the Sega Saturn and Microsoft Windows, eventually being bundled alongside Atelier Elie for the Sega Dreamcast and later PlayStation 2.

A fan translation of the PlayStation 2 bundle was completed in 2018. The game is scheduled for release in English in July 2023 as part of the Digital Deluxe Edition of an upcoming remake.

Plot
Marie is a 19-year-old student in Salburg, a make-believe medieval-style city. She is the worst student in her entire class, and is at the risk of expulsion. However, her teacher offers her a chance at salvation; Marie is given her own workshop (Atelier) in which she is given five years to produce something outstanding.

Characters

The protagonist of the game. She has poor concentration which affects her academic performance, but she is nonetheless a clever alchemist.

A 19-year-old girl from a wealthy family who is Marie's best friend. She suffers from poor health.

17-year-old apprentice alchemist and one of the academy's most talented students. He has a rude and arrogant attitude.

A 17-year-old adventurer seeking his parents, who were lost due to war between the Shigsal and Domhaid kingdoms.

A 23-year-old adventurer who desires to become a knight, though he does not feel confident in his strength.

A 20-year-old adventurer from the southern kingdom with a cheerful personality.

The 23-year-old commander of the royal guard, who is considered the most powerful of the kingdom's knights.

Gameplay
The game is centered around collecting ingredients, usually outside of town, creating items, and using the items for various quests or for use in battle. In battle, the player can have a maximum of two allies. Like Marie, these allies can attack, defend, use a strong attack, use items, or flee.

Music
The music was composed by the "G.S.T. Gust Sound Team Atelier So-La" consisting of Akira Tsuchiya, Daisuke Achiwa, and Toshiharu Yamanishi. Tsuchiya went on to contribute towards all the Atelier titles up to Atelier Iris: Eternal Mana along with Gust's other prominent franchise, Ar tonelico. Yamanishi contributed to Atelier Elie as well, and Achiwa has contributed to most of the titles in the series since then.

Development and release
Atelier Marie was developed by Gust Co. Ltd. Series creator Shinichi Yoshiike liked creating and collecting things, and wanted to make a game that satisfied that part of himself. The inspiration for the game came from learning about alchemy in his university studies.

Atelier Marie was released on various different platforms, with each succeeding port presenting additional feature updates. The Sega Saturn port, known as Atelier Marie version 1.3, added internal clock functionality which allowed specific messages to be played at certain times, such as during late nights, on holidays, or on Marlone's birthday. In addition, a number of additional events and a mini-game are also added. An enhanced edition titled Atelier Marie Plus was released on PlayStation on June 4, 1998. This version featured the additions from the Sega Saturn version with the exception of the internal clock (which was not supported by PlayStation), with the only new addition being DualShock rumble functionality support.

The game was bundled alongside Atelier Elie on the Sega Dreamcast and released on November 15, 2001. The first-print copies of the Dreamcast game were infected with the Kriz computer virus, which infected Microsoft Windows-based computers when the game disc was inserted and had no effect on the Dreamcast system itself. The screensaver virus erased the CMOS and BIOS settings, and attempted to overwrite files located on hard drives and the local network. The game was recalled by the publisher due to the virus. A bundle with Atelier Elie was also released on PlayStation 2 on October 27, 2005. On December 26, 2007, the game was released digitally on the PlayStation Network.

Over 25 years after its initial release, Atelier Marie Plus will be localized in English and released as part of the Digital Deluxe Edition of Atelier Marie Remake for Nintendo Switch, PlayStation 4, PlayStation 5 and Microsoft Windows on July 13, 2023.

Remake
A remake of the game, titled ‎Atelier Marie Remake: The Alchemist of Salburg is scheduled to release for Nintendo Switch, PlayStation 4, PlayStation 5 and Microsoft Windows on July 13, 2023.

Reception
Famitsu gave the original PlayStation version a review score of 32/40, the highest score for an Atelier title prior to Atelier Escha & Logy: Alchemists of the Dusk Sky. Atelier Marie Plus received a rating of 30/40 from Famitsu.

Notes

References

External links
 

1997 video games
Android (operating system) games
Dreamcast games
Gust Corporation games
IOS games
Japanese role-playing video games
Video games featuring female protagonists
M
Japan-exclusive video games
Nintendo Switch games
PlayStation (console) games
PlayStation 2 games
PlayStation 4 games
PlayStation 5 games
Sega Saturn games
Video games developed in Japan
Windows games

ja:アトリエシリーズ (ザールブルグ)#マリーのアトリエ 〜ザールブルグの錬金術士〜